Mauprat refers to:

 Mauprat (novel), a novel by George Sand
 Mauprat (film), a French silent film based on the novel